Dopo may refer to

Dopo (band), Portuguese psych/freak folk music band
Dopo (clothing), a traditional Korean overcoat worn during the Joseon Dynasty
Dopo il veglione, a 1914 Italian film
Dopo _/ Adesso, one of two restaurants in Oakland, California run by the same person
dopo as in "dopo festival", post festival, see Wiktionary:après